Your Television Babysitter, also billed as Your TV Babysitter, was a daytime live television children’s series which debuted November 1, 1948, on the DuMont Television Network, and was hosted by Pat Meikle and created by her husband Hal Cooper.

Broadcast history
Your Television Babysitter was hosted by Pat (Mary Patricia) Meikle. In each episode, Meikle would tell a story using her “magic chalkboard”, from which colorful fairy-tale characters would appear, including Maxwell the Mouse. The series was produced by Hal Cooper (February 23, 1923 - April 11, 2014), Pat Meikle's husband. They married on December 21, 1944, had two children Bethami (b. August 16, 1954) and Pamela. Meikle and Cooper divorced in 1970.

Your Television Babysitter, which aired Monday through Friday 8:30am to 9am ET, led to a spin-off, Meikle and Cooper’s The Magic Cottage, which was aimed at slightly older children, and aired on weekday evenings from 6:30 to 7 pm ET.

According to the book The Forgotten Network, both series were well received by television critics at the time. Variety praised Meikle and stated that "her knowing method of not talking down to her moppet audience is probably the answer to a mother’s prayers. She's already being touted as a new TV star." The Magic Cottage continued on DuMont’s flagship station WABD until 1955. Meikle continued to work at WABD after both series had finished their runs.

Episode status
As with most DuMont series, no episodes are known to exist.

See also
List of programs broadcast by the DuMont Television Network
List of surviving DuMont Television Network broadcasts
1948–49 United States network television schedule (weekday)
Playroom, DuMont children's series
Kids and Company, DuMont children's series hosted by Johnny Olsen
The Magic Cottage (1949-1951) DuMont series also created by Meikle and Hal Cooper

References

Bibliography
David Weinstein, The Forgotten Network: DuMont and the Birth of American Television (Philadelphia: Temple University Press, 2004) 
Alex McNeil, Total Television, Fourth edition (New York: Penguin Books, 1980) 
Tim Brooks and Earle Marsh, The Complete Directory to Prime Time Network TV Shows, Third edition (New York: Ballantine Books, 1964)

External links
 DuMont historical website

DuMont Television Network original programming
1948 American television series debuts
1949 American television series endings
1940s American children's television series
Black-and-white American television shows
English-language television shows
Lost American television shows